is a passenger railway station in located in the city of Ise, Mie Prefecture, Japan, operated by Central Japan Railway Company (JR Tōkai).

Lines
Yamada-Kamiguchi Station is served by the Sangū Line, and is located 13.2 rail kilometers from the terminus of the line at Taki Station.

Station layout
The station consists of a single side platform serving one bi-directional track.

Platforms

Adjacent stations

|-

History
The station was renamed to its present name after a complaint was lodged to the Railway Ministry by the mayor of Uji-yamada, stating that the name was difficult to read, and that the bridge in question was an insignificantly small landmark located over 300 meters from the station. The station has been unattended since December 21, 1983. The station was absorbed into the JR Central network upon the privatization of the JNR on April 1, 1987.

Passenger statistics
In fiscal 2019, the station was used by an average of 120 passengers daily (boarding passengers only).

Surrounding area
Miya River • Miya Riverbank Park lined with cherry blossoms
Yokohama Rubber Company Mie plant
Ujiyamada High School
Ise Library
Kintetsu - Miyamachi Station

See also
List of railway stations in Japan

References

External links

Railway stations in Japan opened in 1893
Railway stations in Mie Prefecture
Ise, Mie